Mortem is a death metal band formed in 1986 in Lima, Peru. They are the first Peruvian metal band to have toured Europe and the United States. Mortem’s musical style is firmly rooted in the death metal, black metal and thrash metal of the 1980s. Mortem's characteristic heavy sound is defined through slow death metal alternated with fast and aggressive counterparts. Tremolo picking in the style of early Possessed and Death built on rhythmic percussion topped with wailing atonal and melodic guitar solos. Vocals are forged from guttural rasps and often develop into high shrieks while lyrics deal mainly with the occult and anti-Christianity.

Biography
Mortem is one of the oldest and most celebrated bands from the obscure Peruvian death metal scene. Founded by Fernán Nebiros and Alvaro Amduscias in July–August 1986, Mortem has been through several line-up changes as they toured South America and released a number of demos. Mortem released their debut album Demon Tales in 1996 after signing a record deal with Peruvian recordlabel Huasipungo Records. Demon Tales would be the second Peruvian metal album ever released, following the Hadez release ‘Aquelarre’ in 1993. Shortly after releasing Demon Tales Mortem was signed to German metal label Merciless Records which made Mortem the first Peruvian metal band ever to sign to a European label.

In 2003 and 2004, Mortem became the first Peruvian metal band in history to tour Europe and the United States. In 2007, with four full-length studio albums and one live album to their name, Mortem have achieved notable underground status and as such loyal support across the continents. Mortem has performed concerts with Sarcofago, Immolation, Sadistic Intent, Possessed, Slayer, among others.

Line-up
Fernán Nebiros – guitar, vocals (1986 – present)
Alvaro Amduscias – drums, bass, vocals (1986–1998, 2000 – present)
Christian Jhon – guitar (1999–1999, 2012–present)
José "Chino Morza" Okamura – bass ( 1991- 1991, 2000- 2000, 2012 - present)

Former members
Pablo "Genocidio" Rey – guitar, bass (1988–1991)
José "Mortuorio" Sagar – drums (1987–1988)
Héctor Panty – guitar (1987–1988)
Hugo "Satanarchust" Calle – drums (1988–1989)
Janio "Tremolón" Cuadros – guitar (1989–1993), live guitar (2000–2003)
Javier "Manthas" Gamarra – bass (1991–1992)
José "Chino Morza" Okamura – live vocals, bass (1991–1991, 2000 - 2000)
Carlos Verástegui – bass (1992–1995)
Jaime García – drums (1998–2000)
Sandro García – guitar (1998–1999)
Juan C. Muro – bass (1995 – 2012)
Wilber Rosán – guitar (1993–1998, 1999 – 2012)

Discography

Studio albums
1995: Demon Tales
1998: The Devil Speaks in Tongues
2000: Decomposed by Possession
2005: De Natura Daemonum
2016: Deinós Nekrómantis

EPs
2006: Devoted To Evil

Demos
1989: Evil Dead
1991: Superstition
1992: Vomit of the Earth
1993: Unearth the Buried Evil

Live albums 
2007: Demonios Atacan Los Angeles

References

External links
Official website
Mortem on Myspace

1986 establishments in Peru
Musical groups established in 1986
Musical quartets
Peruvian black metal musical groups
Peruvian death metal musical groups